Fue is the Japanese word for flute, and refers to a class of flutes native to Japan.

Fue or FUE may also refer to:

 Borgu Fulfulde language, spoken in Benin and Togo
 Follicular unit extraction
 French University of Egypt
 Future University in Egypt
 Fuerteventura Airport, in Spain

People with the name Fue
Fue Lee (born 1991), American politician
Masato Fue (born 1973), Japanese football player and manager

See also
Few (disambiguation)